Laurence Bond "Larry" Miller is an American rock and Avant grade guitarist based in Ann Arbor, Michigan, United States. Miller is a former member of Destroy All Monsters, Sproton Layer, M3, Nonfiction, The Empty Set, and Larynx Zillion's Novelty Shop.

Biography
Destroy All Monsters was a notable part of the proto-punk, punk, and post-punk Detroit rock scene, featuring such bands as the MC5, the Stooges, and Up. In the late 1980s, he enjoyed renewed commercial success with his single Southpaws Unite!, a John Philip Sousa military-esque march crossed with an Avant grade punk sensibility via the latest Techno Pop technology of the day.

Miller plays guitar left-handed, or “upside down,” in a style popularized by Jimi Hendrix.

Miller began his career as a professional musician at the age of 16 and has made numerous recordings in which all instruments are played by himself, including woodwinds, keyboards, and various stringed instruments, in the manner of Todd Rundgren and Paul McCartney.

Laurence Miller is the younger brother of Roger Miller, a founding and current member of the Boston-based Mission of Burma, and the twin brother of Benjamin (Ben) Miller, also a former member of Destroy All Monsters.  Both of Laurence's parents were scientists and professors at the University of Michigan.  His father was well known in the field of paleo-ichthyology. He also has a brother who is a well-respected professor and glaciologist, and a sister (now deceased) who was also a scientist and a professor.

Laurence grew up in Ann Arbor, MI attended public schools, and graduated from Pioneer High School. He went to college at the Boston School of Contemporary Music, finishing up at Thomas Jefferson State College before retiring completely from the academic scene.

Laurence has collaborated with his brother Roger Miller from time to time, particularly on the M3 project, named for the three Miller brothers, but he has collaborated with his twin Ben most consistently over the years, particularly through the 1980s and early 1990s.  Since Ben is a right-hander and Laurence is a left-hander and they collaborated mostly as a power trio by adding a drummer. When Nonfiction ended,  Laurence formed The Empty Set, and then later in the 1990s creating Larynx Zillion's Novelty Shop.

In 1999, Laurence reinvented himself as a children's entertainer. 

Currently Laurence is focused on two bands with identical twin brother Benjamin Miller; EMPOOL and EXPLODED VIEW. He is also working in a band he formed called LAURENCE MILLER AND THE LOVE MANIACS.

Family
Laurence has three daughters, Tara, Ashia, and Brittany, from his relationship with their late mother, Donna Savakis.

References

External links
 Homepage of Larry Miller

Year of birth missing (living people)
Living people
American rock guitarists
American male guitarists
Musicians from Ann Arbor, Michigan
Protopunk musicians
Guitarists from Michigan
Sproton Layer members